HMS Torrid was an  destroyer which served with the Royal Navy during World War I. The ship was launched on 10 February 1917 and served as part of the Harwich Force. Subsequently, Torrid was used in the 1930s as a trials ship for new anti-submarine warfare weapons, particularly playing a role in the development of ASDIC. During this time, the destroyer was commanded by Charles Pizey, later the first Chief of the Naval Staff of the Indian Navy. The vessel was wrecked off the Falmouth coast en route to being broken up on 16 March 1937.

Design and development
Torrid was one of ten  destroyers ordered by the British Admiralty in March 1916 as part of the Eighth War Construction Programme. The R class were a development of the preceding , but differed in having geared turbines to improve fuel consumption, the central gun mounted on a bandstand and minor changes to improve seakeeping.

Three funnels were fitted.

Armament consisted of three  Mk IV QF guns on the ship's centreline, with one on the forecastle, one aft on a raised platform and one between the second and third funnels. A single 2-pounder (40 mm) pom-pom anti-aircraft gun was carried, while torpedo armament consisted of two twin mounts for  torpedoes. The ship had a complement of 82 officers and ratings.

Construction and career
Torrid was laid down by Swan Hunter & Wigham Richardson at Wallsend on the River Tyne on 19 July 1916 with the yard number 1025 and launched on 10 February 1917. The ship was completed on 5 May 1917. The destroyer was the first warship to carry the name in the Royal Navy, although it was derived from the name of a prize taken in 1798, Torride. On commissioning, Torrid joined the 10th Destroyer Flotilla of the Harwich Force. Torrid remained part of the 10th Destroyer Flotilla at the end of the war, but was reduced to Crew on 20 October 1919.

During the 1930s, Torrid was used as a trial ship for new anti-submarine weapons. The ship was equipped with ASDIC in 1930, and successfully demonstrated that the system worked. Torrid subsequently used ASDIC to successfully find the sunken aircraft-carrying submarine  on 3 February 1932. ASDIC went on to prove invaluable in the Battle of the Atlantic. The vessel was also used to trial a forward-firing anti-submarine mortar with less success. During this time, between 18 December 1930 and 10 July 1931, the destroyer was commanded by Charles Pizey, later the first Chief of the Naval Staff of the Indian Navy.

Torrid was considered as part of the planned Royal Navy deployment in defence of traffic between Port Said and Alexandria on 19 October 1935 after the start of the Second Italo-Ethiopian War but was retired before the outbreak of hostilities between Italy and the British Empire. The destroyer was handed over to Thos. W. Ward of Sheffield on 27 January 1937 in exchange for RMS Majestic. However, while being towed to the breakers on 16 March 1937, the ship ran aground onto rocks at Trefusis, Falmouth. The wreck was broken up and scrapped in situ, but remains of interest to divers.

The ship's plaque, bearing the motto, is held by the Imperial War Museum.

Pennant numbers

References

Bibliography

 
 
 </ref>
 
 </ref>
 
 
 
 
 

1917 ships
Ships built on the River Tyne
R-class destroyers (1916)
World War I destroyers of the United Kingdom
Maritime incidents in 1937